Anamaria Govorčinović (born 17 May 1997) is a Croatian canoeist. She competed in the women's K-1 200 metres and the K-1 500 metres  events at the 2020 Summer Olympics.

References

External links
 

1997 births
Living people
Croatian female canoeists
Canoeists at the 2020 Summer Olympics
Olympic canoeists of Croatia
Canoeists at the 2019 European Games
European Games competitors for Croatia
20th-century Croatian women
21st-century Croatian women
ICF Canoe Sprint World Championships medalists in kayak